The Beachcomber is a pair of open top bus services operated in Bridlington and Scarborough during summertime by East Yorkshire.

History
The Beachcomber brand was launched in 2019, coinciding with the purchase of eight second-hand Wright Eclipse Geminis. The Scarborough open top service previously operated as route 109. The Bridlington service previously operated as route 100.

The services were suspended during the national COVID-19 lockdowns, but returned in July 2020. For 2021, service frequencies on both routes were increased, and the Scarborough route was extended.

Routes
The Bridlington service travels along the coast to Flamborough Head. The Scarborough service also follows the coast, travelling from The Spa in the south to the Sea Life centre in the north.

References

Bus routes in England